The 1978–79 Soviet Cup was the 19th edition of the Soviet Cup ice hockey tournament. CSKA Moscow won the cup for the 11th time in their history. The cup was divided into four groups, with the top team in each group advancing to the playoffs. CSKA Moscow and Dynamo Moscow received byes until the playoff semifinals.

Group phase

Group 1

Group 2

Group 3

Group 4

Playoffs

Quarterfinals

Semifinals

Final

External links 
 Tournament on hockeyarchives.info
 Tournament on hockeyarchives.ru

Cup
Soviet Cup (ice hockey) seasons